Ballengarra, New South Wales is a bounded rural locality of Mid-Coast Council New South Wales and a civil parish of Macquarie County on the Mid North Coast.   Ballengarra, is located at 31°15′54″S 152°45′04″E.

References

Mid North Coast
Towns in New South Wales